Ro01-6128 is a drug used in scientific research, which acts as a selective positive allosteric modulator for the metabotropic glutamate receptor subtype mGluR1. It was derived by modification of a lead compound found via high-throughput screening, and was further developed to give the improved compound Ro67-4853.

References

Hoffmann-La Roche brands
Carbamates
MGlu1 receptor agonists